Caprona is a subgenus of butterflies.

Caprona may also refer to:

Caprona (island), a fictitious place
The Magicians of Caprona, a 1980 Diana Wynne Jones book
Caprona, Vicopisano, a village in the province of Pisa, Italy